Marko Johansson (born 25 August 1998) is a Swedish professional footballer who plays as a goalkeeper for Bundesliga club VfL Bochum, on loan from Hamburger SV.

Career
Marko Johansson made his first team debut for Malmö FF in a Champions League qualifier against FK Žalgiris on 21 July 2015. The 16 year old Johansson came on in the 50th minute as a result of a Zlatan Azinović injury and kept the clean sheet intact as MFF advanced to the next round.

Johansson was loaned to Superettan side Trelleborgs FF for the 2017 season. On October 30, 2017 it was announced that the loan had been extended over the 2018 season. Just days later Johansson helped Trelleborg win the promotion playoff against Jönköpings Södra IF to end the club's six year absence from the Swedish top tier. He made his Allsvenskan debut on 1 April 2018 in a 3-1 defeat against IFK Göteborg.

In 2020, he played 16 games when Malmö FF won their 21st Swedish Championship, conceding 18 goals.

Personal life 
Johansson is of maternal Serbian descent.

Career statistics

Honours

Malmö FF
Allsvenskan: 2020, 2021

References

External links
 
  (archive)

1998 births
Living people
Swedish footballers
Sweden youth international footballers
Sweden under-21 international footballers
Swedish people of Serbian descent
Association football goalkeepers
VfL Bochum players
Hamburger SV players
Malmö FF players
Trelleborgs FF players
GAIS players
Allsvenskan players
Superettan players
Footballers from Malmö